Perrin's cave beetle, Siettitia balsetensis, is an extinct freshwater beetle from France. It and Siettitia ayenionensis are the only two species in the genus Siettitia.

This subterranean species was discoloured, its sensory silks were well developed and the eyes were extremely reduced and probably functional. The tracheae of its wing-cases (elytra) were well developed and it absorbed dissolved oxygen through its cuticle.

See also
 List of extinct animals of Europe

References

Dytiscidae
Cave beetles
Extinct insects since 1500
Extinct beetles
Extinct animals of Europe
Beetles described in 1904
Endemic beetles of Metropolitan France
Taxa named by Elzéar Abeille de Perrin